The men's single sculls competition at the 1948 Summer Olympics took place at Henley-on-Thames, London, United Kingdom. The event was held from 5 to 9 August. There were 14 competitors from 14 nations, with each nation limited to a single boat in the event. The event was won by Mervyn Wood of Australia, the nation's third victory in four Games (Bobby Pearce had won in 1928 and 1932). Eduardo Risso's silver was Uruguay's second medal in the event, after a bronze in 1932. Italy received its first men's single sculls medal with Romolo Catasta's bronze. The United States had its five-Games podium streak in the event ended, as John B. Kelly Jr. lost his semifinal by 0.4 seconds and did not advance to the final.

Background

This was the 10th appearance of the event. Rowing had been on the programme in 1896 but was cancelled due to bad weather. The single sculls has been held every time that rowing has been contested, beginning in 1900.

None of the 20 single scullers from the pre-war 1936 Games returned, though Australia's Mervyn Wood had been on the eight team. The three post-war Diamond Challenge Sculls champions were all competing: Wood (1948) was the reigning winner, with Jean Séphériadès of France (1946) and John B. Kelly Jr. of the United States (1947) the previous title holders. Séphériadès was also the 1947 European champion. Kelly was the son of 1920 Olympic champion John B. Kelly Sr. (who had famously been excluded from the Diamond Challenge Sculls).

Egypt and Greece each made their debut in the event. Great Britain made its ninth appearance, most among nations, having missed only the 1904 Games in St. Louis.

Competition format

The venue, Henley-on-Thames, imposed certain restrictions and modifications to the format. The course could handle only three boats at a time (and this required expansion of the typical Henley course), so the six-boat final introduced in 1936 was not possible this time. The course distance was also modified; instead of either the 2000 metres distance that was standard for the Olympics or the 1 mile 550 yards (2112 metres) standard at Henley, a course that was somewhat shorter than either was used. Sources disagree on the exact distance: 1929 metres is listed by the Official Report, though other sources say 1850 metres.

The format was largely similar to the 1936 Games, though with the three-boats-per-race limit. There were four rounds: quarterfinals, a repechage, semifinals, and a final.

 Quarterfinals: There were 5 heats of 2 or 3 boats each. The winner of each advanced to the semifinals, while all other boats went to the repechage.
 Repechage: The 9 boats were placed in 3 heats of 3 boats each. Again, the winner of each advanced to the semifinals; the remaining 6 boats were eliminated.
 Semifinals: The remaining 8 boats competed in unbalanced semifinals: 2 heats had 3 boats, while the last heat had 2. Only the winners advanced, with the other 5 boats eliminated.
 Final: The final featured the three medalists racing to determine which color each would receive.

Schedule

All times are British Summer Time (UTC+1)

Results

Quarterfinals

The first rower in each heat advanced directly to the semifinals. The others competed again in the repechage for remaining spots in the semifinals.

Quarterfinal 1

Quarterfinal 2

Quarterfinal 3

Quarterfinal 4

Quarterfinal 5

No official time was recorded in this heat.

Repechage

The winner of each race advanced to the semifinals; the other rowers are eliminated.

Repechage heat 1

Repechage heat 2

Repechage heat 3

Semifinals

The winner of each race advanced to the final.

Semifinal 1

Semifinal 2

Semifinal 3

Final

Results summary

References

External links

Rowing at the 1948 Summer Olympics